Xyloskenea xenos is a species of sea snail, a marine gastropod mollusc, unassigned in the superfamily Seguenzioidea.

Distribution
This species occurs in the northeastern Atlantic Ocean.

References

External links
 To Encyclopedia of Life
 To World Register of Marine Species

xenos
Molluscs of Europe
Gastropods described in 2010